This is a list of diplomatic missions of Nepal, excluding honorary consulates. Nepal's first semblance of a diplomatic network started in the reign of King Prithivi Narayan Shah, when in 1769 he established a foreign office called Jaishi Kotha.  Over centuries the office slowly grew in stature until it became a government Department in 1934, although by the time of the revolution in 1950 Nepal only had diplomatic relations with India, Britain, France and the United States.  The Nepalese Ministry of Foreign Affairs rapidly expanded in the 1950s and 1960s, driven by Nepal's precarious strategic position sandwiched between India and China.

As of 2022, Nepal's diplomatic network consists of 31 embassies, 7 consulates-general, and 2 permanent missions.

Current missions

Africa

Americas

Asia

Europe

Oceania

Multilateral organisations

Gallery

Closed missions

Europe

References

External links
 Ministry of Foreign Affairs (Nepal)

See also

 Foreign relations of Nepal
 Ministry of Foreign Affairs (Nepal)

Nepal

Diplomatic missions